= Italian Amateur Championship (snooker) =

Tournament information
- Venue: Sala Azzurra
- Location: Milan
- Country: Italy
- Established: 2015; 11 years ago
- Organisation(s): Federazione Italiana Biliardo Sportivo
- Format: Amateur event
- Recent edition: 2017
- Current champion: Massimiliano Sabetta

The Italian Amateur Championship is an annual snooker competition played in Italy and is the highest ranking amateur event there.

The competition was established, in 2015 in which Pietro Caperna defeated Gianmarco Tonini 6–4 to become the first champion in the tournament's history. The championship is currently held by Massimiliano Sabetta.

== Winners ==
Year	Winner	Runner-up	Final score	City
2015	Pietro Caperna	Gianmarco Tonini	6–4	Milan, Lombardy
2016	Gianmarco Tonini	Lino Rivara	6–1	Milan, Lombardy
2017	Massimiliano Sabetta	Gianluigi Luoni	7–4	Turin, Piedmont

== Stats ==
=== Finalists ===
Rank	Name	Winner	Runner-up	Finals
1	Gianmarco Tonini	1	1	2
2	Pietro Caperna	1	0	1
2	Massimiliano Sabetta	1	0	1
4	Lino Rivara	0	1	1
4	Gianluigi Luoni	0	1	1
